Beibi Gong (born February 21, 1978 in Fujian, China) is a Chinese film and television actress. Beginning her acting career as a teenager, she later graduated from the prestigious Central Academy of Drama where she first gained recognition among audiences in China after starring in several popular TV series and feature films in both China and Hong Kong. Due to her success while still a student, Gong was dubbed in the media at the time as "little Gong Li", who also graduated from the same acting college.

After graduating, Gong continued diversifying her roles with different projects, including starring in and executive producing Bus 44, which gained her critical acclaim in China, Europe, and North America where it premiered and won awards at the Venice Film Festival, Sundance Film Festival and Cannes Film Festival.

In 2005, Gong Beibi starred in the feature film Waiting Alone which opened to critical raves at the Tokyo Film Festival. The indie film was released nationwide in September 2005 and became a hit with youth audiences across China, and one of the best reviewed and most talked about Chinese films the year. Waiting Alone was nominated for several awards including "Best Picture" at the Chinese academy awards (Golden Rooster Awards). Gong Beibi's memorable performance in Waiting Alone, which Variety magazine called "impressive", garnered her a "Most Favorite Actress" nomination at the12th Beijing Student Film Festival.

Gong's 2007 Chinese holiday ensemble comedy Call for Love was a success at the box office, she followed up with a special appearance in action director Benny Chan's Connected the Hong Kong action film remake of Cellular, and continued starring in TV series.

In 2010, Gong co-starred with Aaron Kwok in Oxide Pang's thriller The Detective 2. In 2011, Beibi Gong starred alongside Academy Award winner Kevin Spacey and Daniel Wu in Dayyan Eng's dramedy/psychological suspense Inseparable. Inseparable was named one of The Wall Street Journal's Top 10 Most Notable Asian Films of 2011.

Beibi was next seen in several back-to-back TV series in China, most notably The Legend of Qin in 2015, and Ice Fantasy based on Guo Jingming's popular fantasy novel in 2016.

In 2017, Gong won the Jury Award for "Best Actress" at the Beijing Youth Film Festival for her starring role in the indie drama Lack of Love. She was also in the hit TV series Fighter of the Destiny and the Monkey King comedy A Chinese Odyssey: Love You a Million Years playing Princess Ironfan. Behind the camera, she was a co-producer on the summer fantasy comedy indie hit Wished.

In 2018, Gong Beibi starred in the TV series The Flame's Daughter which had over 700 million viewing hits in China and was later on Amazon Prime, as well as, co-starring in the surprise summer blockbuster hit, Dying to Survive, which become one of the biggest box office films in China. Beibi played two different lead characters in Summer Blur, which won awards at Busan Film Festival and the 2021 Berlin Film Festival Generations section.

In 2021, Gong starred in the indie sports drama On Your Mark which did well at the Chinese box office, the film was directed by Malaysian director Chiu Keng Guan.

Beibi Gong was next seen in the TV series remake of The Return of the Condor Heroes playing one of the iconic roles, as well as two other TV series in China. She also stars alongside Duan Yihong in the Jia Zhang-Ke produced crime drama Heaven and Hell, releasing in 2023.

Personal life 
Bachelor of Arts in Drama, from Central Drama Academy in Beijing, China. She can speak Mandarin, Minnanyu (Hokkien), and English.

Selected Acting filmography 
You Are Not Sixteen  (1994)
Beijing Hong Kong Love Connection  (1997)
The Lord of Hangzhou  (1998)
An Unusual Love  (1998) 
Sun Moon Star (1999)
Bus 44  (2001) (Also Executive Producer) 
Waiting Alone  (2004) * Nominated - Audience Favorite Actress / Beijing Students Film Festival
The Ghost Inside (2005)
Call for Love (2007) * Nominated - Audience Favorite Actress / Beijing Students Film Festival
Connected (2008)
The Founding of a Republic (2009)
Zhao Dan (2010) (TV series)
The Detective 2 (B+侦探) (2011)
Inseparable (2011)
Lucky Dog (2013)
The Buddha's Shadow (2014)
Over the Sky (2014)
Journey (2015)
Wo de hun yin shui zuo zhu (2015)
Bad Bosses (2015)
The Legend of Qin (live action TV series) (2015)
Ice Fantasy (2016)
Lack of Love (2017)  * Won - Best Actress Award / Beijing Youth Film Festival
Fighter of the Destiny (2017)
A Chinese Odyssey: Love You a Million Years (2017)
The Flame's Daughter  (2018)
Dying to Survive (2018)
My People, My Country (2019)
Adoring (2019)
In a Class of Her Own (2020)
The Blooms at Ruyi Pavilion (2020)
Summer Blur (2020)
On Your Mark (2021)
Pride & Price (2022)
The Return of the Condor Heroes (2022)
Master of My Own (请叫我总监) (2022)
The Fallen Bridge (断桥) (2022)
Meet Yourself (去有风的地方)(2023)
Look Up and See Joy (抬头见喜)(2023)
Heaven and Hell (2023)

External links
Official Site of Beibi Gong 
Gong Beibi Weibo 龚蓓苾微博
Beibi Gong Instagram

References

Living people
Chinese film actresses
Chinese television actresses
Actresses from Fujian
Central Academy of Drama alumni
People from Shishi, Fujian
21st-century Chinese actresses
20th-century Chinese actresses
1978 births